The Stopover is a 2016 French film directed by Delphine and Muriel Coulin. It explores the tensions among a group of French soldiers returning from a tour of duty in Afghanistan, focusing on the experiences of three young women. The film premiered at the 2016 Cannes Film Festival in the Un Certain Regard section where the sisters won the award for Best Screenplay.

Plot
After a tour of duty in Afghanistan, a group of French soldiers are flown for a three-day stay at a luxurious beach hotel in Cyprus. Not only for rest and relaxation, since the Army also uses the break to address the psychological effects of returning to France from a high-stress environment in which comrades have been wounded or killed. As well as enjoying themselves, the soldiers have to participate in group therapy sessions where individuals, sometimes painfully, are made to relive moments of danger and terror.

But the tension is still there under the surface. Three of the French women accept the offer of a drive into the mountains with two Cypriot men, which results in drinking, dancing, and sex. Three of the French men go in search of them, also inflamed with alcohol, rescue their comrades and then, to punish their disloyalty, stop in the woods to rape them. After drunken struggles among the trees, the men drive off and the women are left to walk all the way back to the hotel. Next morning everything returns to normal, with military discipline resumed as the soldiers, men and women together, board a plane for Paris.

Cast
Soko as Marine
Ariane Labed as Aurore
Ginger Romàn as Fanny
Karim Leklou as Max
Andreas Konstantinou as Chrystos
Makis Papadimitriou as Harry
Alexis Manenti as Jonathan
Robin Barde as Toni
Sylvain Loreau as Momo
Jérémie Laheurte as Ness
Damien Bonnard as The lieutenant

References

External links

French drama films
2016 films
Films based on French novels
Films directed by Delphine and Muriel Coulin
2010s French films